Lion is a color that is a representation of the average color of the fur of a lion.  

The lion is a feline top predator found in Africa and India.  
The lion was poetically called the king of beasts in the great chain of being, one of the bases of medieval philosophy in Western civilization.  

The first recorded use of lion as a color name in English was in 1551.

References

See also
 List of colors

Lion
Lion
Lion